There have been multiple prison escapes where an inmate escapes by means of a helicopter.  One of the earliest instances was the escape of Joel David Kaplan, nicknamed "Man Fan", on August 19, 1971, from the Santa Martha Acatitla in Mexico. Kaplan was a New York businessman who not only escaped the prison but eventually got out of Mexico and went on to write a book about his experience, The 10-Second Jailbreak.

France has had more recorded helicopter escape attempts than any other country, with at least 11. One of the most notable French jail breaks occurred in 1986, when the wife of bank robber Michel Vaujour studied for months to learn how to fly a helicopter. Using her newly acquired skills, she rented a white helicopter and flew low over Paris to pluck her husband off the roof of his fortress prison. Vaujour was later seriously wounded in a shootout with police, and his pilot wife was arrested.

The record for most helicopter escapes goes to convicted murderer Pascal Payet, who has used helicopters to escape from prisons in 2001, 2003, and most recently 2007.

Another multiple helicopter escapee is Vassilis Palaiokostas, who on February 22, 2009, escaped for the second time from the same prison.

To thwart attempts of this nature, many prisons have taken precautions such as nets or cables strung over open prison courtyards.

This list includes prisoner escapes where a helicopter was used in an attempt to free prisoners from a place of internment, a prison or correctional facility.

Actual attempts

Escapes in fiction

See also
List of prison escapes
List of people who escaped multiple times from prison
List of prisoner-of-war escapes
Escape tunnel
Rescue
Prison escape

References

Helicopter history

Escapes
Lists of events